Happy Landings and Lost Tracks is a compilation album by the Fixx released on 11 December 2001.

Happy Landings 1996 planned album release
The Happy Landings and Lost Tracks compilation comprises tracks recorded during sessions that commenced at Fairless Masterman's flat, Castellain Road, Maida Vale, London on 26 February 1996 and concluded on 28 April, for the planned Happy Landings album to be released later that year with the following track listing (other tracks recorded during these sessions included "House Arrest" and "Prove Yourself"):

"Modern World" – 4:08
"Two Different Views" – 5:11
"Going Without" – 4:41
"Freeman" – 6:06
"Happy Landings" – 4:25
"Ocean Blue" – 6:05
"We Once Held Hands" – 7:48
"Sweet Pandemonium" – 4:01
"Mayfly" – 5:42
"Elected" – 2:54

Happy Landings 1997 planned album release
The 1996 version of the Happy Landings album was not released, but eight of the tracks were subsequently re-recorded/remixed by Stephen W. Tayler and Sadia Sadia during February and March 1997 for a planned release of the album later that year, with the newly recorded tracks of "Lonely As A Lighthouse" (recorded 10–12 February 1997 at Route One Studios, London) and "Life's What's Killing Me" replacing "Mayfly" and "Elected" (another track under development at this time was titled, "Peace Louise"):

"Modern World"
"Two Different Views"
"Going Without"
"Happy Landings"
"Freeman"
"We Once Held Hands"
"Lonely As A Lighthouse"
"Ocean Blue"
"Life's What's Killing Me"
"Sweet Pandemonium"
 Cy Curnin – lead vocals, guitar
 Rupert Greenall – keyboards, vocals
 Jamie West-Oram – guitar, vocals, lead vocals on "Sweet Pandemonium"
 Adam Woods – drums

Additional personnel
 Jeff Scantlebury – percussion
 Chris Tait – bass on "Modern World" and "Two Different Views"
 Dennis Bovell – bass on "Going Without", "Freeman" and "We Once Held Hands"
 Dan K. Brown – bass on "Sweet Pandemonium"
 Matthew Kleinman & Jason McDermot – brass on "Freeman"
 Liz Skillings – background vocals on "Two Different Views", "Ocean Blue" and "Sweet Pandemonium"

Six of the 1997 session tracks ("Two Different Views", "Going Without", "Happy Landings", "We Once Held Hands", "Ocean Blue" and "Life's What's Killing Me") were subsequently re-recorded/remixed/edited for the Elemental album released in April 1998.

The 1997 version of "Sweet Pandemonium" was made available as a digital download.

Happy Landings 1997 five-track EP
A limited edition (1000 copies) five-track EP of "tracks from the forthcoming album Happy Landings" was pressed and made available for sale on the band's tour commencing on 10 July 1997.  The versions of these five tracks are unique to this EP, except for "Two Different Views" and "Going Without", which also appeared on the 2000 re-release of the "Missing Links" compilation on the Fuel 2000 label.  This version of "Two Different Views" also appeared on the Ultimate Collection compilation album of 1999.

"Two Different Views" – 5:50
"Going Without" – 4:58
"Happy Landings" – 5:03
"Freeman" – 4:33
"We Once Held Hands" – 8:23
 Produced and engineered by Martin Rex
 Additional production and mixing by Stephen W. Tayler and Sadia
 Executive production: Sadia
 Mastered at Metropolis Studios, London
 Mastering engineer: Ian Cooper
 Management: Jeff Neben / Axis Management
 All songs written by the Fixx
 Hit & Run Music Publishing Inc. JARC Ltd.
 (ASCAP) 1997 Administration by Warner Chappell Music
 Hit & Run Music MMR8080

Additional notes
Happy Landings and Lost Tracks marks the first time all ten session tracks from 1996 have been released as originally recorded, five* for the first time, although "Modern World" and "Elected" had previously been available as digital downloads.

Of the ten tracks re-recorded/remixed with Stephen W. Tayler and Sadia Sadia in early 1997, only "Modern World", "Lonely As A Lighthouse", "Ocean Blue" and "Life's What's Killing Me" remain unreleased.

"Lonely As A Lighthouse", "House Arrest" and "Peace Louise" remain unreleased in any form whatsoever and truly are "lost" tracks.

An earlier (1991–1994) recorded version of "Mayfly" (written by Cy Curnin and Stuart Zaltz) appears on the same-titled first solo album by Cy Curnin in 2005.

Track listing
"Modern World" – 4:08*
"Going Without" – 4:41
"Freeman" – 6:06*
"Elected" – 2:54*
"Mayfly" – 5:42*
"Two Different Views" – 5:11
"Ocean Blue" – 6:05
"We Once Held Hands" – 7:48
"Sweet Pandemonium" – 4:01*
"Happy Landings" – 4:25

Personnel
 Cy Curnin – lead vocals, guitar
 Adam Woods – drums
 Rupert Greenall – keyboards, vocals
 Jamie West-Oram – guitar, vocals

Additional personnel
 Jeff Scantlebury — percussion
 Dennis Bovell — bass on "Going Without", "Freeman" and "We Once Held Hands"
 Dan K. Brown — bass on "Mayfly" and "Sweet Pandemonium"; Suzaphone on "Elected"
 Chris Tait — bass on "Modern World"
 Matthew Kleinman and Jason McDermot — brass on "Freeman" and "Elected"
 Liz Skillings — background vocals on "Ocean Blue"

Production
 Produced and engineered by Martin Rex (mixed by Martin Rex at Howard Jones' shed on a Euphonix console)
 Mastered by Steve Hall at Future Disc
 All songs written by the Fixx
 All songs published by Yadu Music Inc. (ASCAP)

References

External links
[ Happy Landings and Lost Tracks] at Allmusic
Happy Landings and Lost Tracks at Rainman Records

The Fixx albums
2001 compilation albums